Let It Die may refer to:

Let It Die (album), 2004 album by Canadian singer-songwriter Feist; or its title track
"Let It Die" (song), 2007 single from the Foo Fighters album Echoes, Silence, Patience & Grace
Let It Die (video game), 2016 hack and slash video game created by developer Grasshopper Manufacture